Ketling (Hassling-Ketling of Elgin) is a fictional character in Henryk Sienkiewicz's novel Fire in the Steppe, the third volume of his award-winning The Trilogy. A Scotsman, Ketling moved to Poland where he became a Colonel of Artillery in service of the king of Poland John Casimir. 
Ketling married Krystyna Drohojowska, a former fiancée of his friend, Michał Wołodyjowski.

Ketling was killed in the Siege of Kamieniec Podolski, when he (together with Wołodyjowski) blew himself up in a gunpowder depot.

The historical personality on which the character was loosely based was certain Major Heyking, a mercenary from Courland and the commander of the Kamieniec Fortress during the said war.

In 1969 Jerzy Hoffman's film Ketling is portrayed by Jan Nowicki.

References 

Sienkiewicz's Trilogy
Literary characters introduced in 1884
Characters in novels of the 19th century
Fictional Scottish people
Fictional suicides
Fictional characters based on real people